Serge Vinçon (17 June 1949 – 16 December 2007), was a French politician of the UMP party. 

Born in Bourges, Cher, he was a college professor before a politician. He was elected senator of Cher on 24 September 1989 and re-elected on 27 September 1998. He was chairman of the Committee on Defense and Foreign Affairs from 2002 until his death and also held the position of mayor of Saint-Amand-Montrond from 1983 until his death. His most notable position was the Vice-President of the Senate.

Vinçon died of cancer on 16 December 2007 at the hospital of Val de Grâce in Paris. Nicolas Sarkozy paid tribute to him in a statement, referring to a "man of letters" and "a brilliant observer of the geopolitical developments of our time" who "will be remembered as a senator who embodies all the qualities of dialogue and compromise that House requires."

External links
 His profile on the site of the French Senate
 His personal site
 Obituary

1949 births
2007 deaths
Politicians from Bourges
Politicians of the French Fifth Republic
Vice-presidents of the Senate (France)
Senators of Cher (department)